Emergent gravity may refer to
 Induced gravity, a theory proposed by Andrei Sakharov in 1967,
 Entropic gravity, a theory proposed by Erik Verlinde in 2009.

Theories of gravity